Narcis Ștefan Mihăilă (born August 4, 1987) is a Romanian racewalker. He placed 31st in the men's 50 kilometres walk at the 2016 Summer Olympics. In 2018, he competed in the men's 50 kilometres walk at the 2018 European Athletics Championships held in Berlin, Germany. He did not finish his race.

References

External links
 

1987 births
Living people
Romanian male racewalkers
Olympic athletes of Romania
Athletes (track and field) at the 2016 Summer Olympics